Cranchia scabra is a species of glass squid. It is the only species in the genus, and is fairly small (about 150 mm). The mantle is covered by large, multi-pointed cartilagenous tubercles. When disturbed, the squid often pulls its head and arms into the mantle cavity and folds its fins tightly against the mantle to form a turgid ball. The tubercules, presumably, provide some type of protection, but it is unclear what predators are affected and how. In addition, the squid may ink into the mantle cavity, making the ball opaque. This was thought to be an aberrant behavior due to stress and confinement of shipboard aquaria until the same inking behavior was seen in cranchiids from submersibles. The function of this behavior is unknown.

The genus contains bioluminescent species. It is named for John Cranch.

References

External links

Tree of Life web project: Cranchia scabra

Squid
Cephalopods described in 1817
Bioluminescent molluscs
Taxa named by William Elford Leach